Robot in the Family (also known as Golddigger) is a 1994 American comedy film produced and directed by Mark Richardson and Jack Shaoul. It was written by Shaoul and stars Joe Pantoliano, John Rhys-Davies, Danny Gerard, and Amy Wright.

Cast
 Joe Pantoliano as Jack Shamir
 John Rhys-Davies as Eli Taki / Rashmud / Sashri
 Danny Gerard as Alex Shamir
 Amy Wright as Kristina Shamir
 Howard Scott Nicoll, Derrick McQueen, Patrick Shanley, and Ari Taub as Golddigger
 Don Peoples as the voice of Golddigger
 Peter Maloney as Dr. Clayhand
 Matthew Locricchio as Clyde Baldino
 David Shuman as Bono Baldino
 Jack Shaoul as Isaac Shamir / Blind Man
 Tom Signorelli as Detective Goober
 Barton Heyman as Mr. Marshall
 Jane Connell as Mrs. Miller

Release
Robot in the Family was distributed on home video in 1994.

Reception
In their review of Robot in the Family, critics Mick Martin and Marsha Porter wrote: "This cheap, sophomoric comedy about an ambulatory robot is one of the worst films we've ever seen".

In popular culture
In March 2020, members of Red Letter Media described the film as "nonsensical" and "madness". Red Letter Media member Rich Evans referred to the film as having "shortcircuited [his] brain every five seconds", and fellow members Jay Bauman and Mike Stoklasa respectively called it "a cacophony of noise" and "the antithesis of sense and logic".

References

External links

1994 comedy films
1994 films
1994 science fiction films
American comedy films
American robot films
1990s English-language films
1990s American films